The Best American Short Stories 2012, a volume in the Best American Short Stories series, was edited by Heidi Pitlor and by guest editor Tom Perotta.

Short Stories included

References

Fiction anthologies
Short Stories 2012
2012 anthologies
Houghton Mifflin books